Park Hae-young is a South Korean screenwriter, best known for writing television series Another Miss Oh (2016), My Mister (2018), and My Liberation Notes (2022).

Filmography

Television

Film

Awards and nominations

State honors

Notes

References

External links
 
 

 
1972 births
Living people
South Korean television writers
South Korean screenwriters